Louis Bazire (30 September 1877, Fontenay-le-Comte - 19 December 1923) was a French politician. He represented the Republican Federation in the Chamber of Deputies from 1919 to 1923.

References

1877 births
1923 deaths
People from Fontenay-le-Comte
Politicians from Pays de la Loire
Republican Federation politicians
Members of the 12th Chamber of Deputies of the French Third Republic
French military personnel of World War I